St. Peter's Secondary School can refer to:
St. Peter's Secondary School (Peterborough), in Ontario
St. Peter's Secondary School (Barrie), in Ontario
St. Peter's Boys Senior High School, Kwahu, Ghana
, Aberdeen, Hong Kong, Hong Kong

See also
 St Peter's School (disambiguation)